Bobby Gene Smith (May 28, 1934 – November 24, 2015) was an American professional baseball player, an outfielder who appeared in 376 games in the Major Leagues between – for the St. Louis Cardinals, Chicago Cubs, Philadelphia Phillies, New York Mets and Los Angeles Angels.

Smith was an original member of the Mets, drafted with the 32nd selection in the 1961 Major League Baseball expansion draft. However, he only spent the first two weeks of the  season with the team, playing in eight games, including five as a starting outfielder, before being dealt to the Cubs on April 26, then sent on to his original team, the Cardinals, on June 5, spending the rest of that campaign as a late-inning replacement for veteran Cardinals superstar Stan Musial in left field.

In , he was one of three Bob Smiths in the Majors, along with pitchers Robert Gilchrist Smith of the Pittsburgh Pirates and Robert Walkup "Riverboat" Smith of the Boston Red Sox. During his career, outfielder Smith was frequently referred to as Bobby Gene Smith by baseball writers to prevent confusion.

Smith's 234 Major-League hits included 35 doubles, five triples and 13 home runs. That year, Smith reached personal bests in hits (62), home runs (4), runs batted in (27) and batting average (.286). He also batted over .300 during his ten-year minor-league career, which ended in 1967.

References

External links

1934 births
2015 deaths
Baseball players from Oregon
Chicago Cubs players
Columbus Cardinals players
Fresno Cardinals players
Houston Buffaloes players
Los Angeles Angels players
Major League Baseball outfielders
New York Mets players
Omaha Cardinals players
Philadelphia Phillies players
People from Hood River, Oregon
Rochester Red Wings players
St. Joseph Cardinals players
St. Louis Cardinals players
Seattle Angels players
Seattle Rainiers players
Tacoma Cubs players